Robert Earle Price, Jr. (born May 23, 1936), was an American politician who was a Democratic member of the Nevada General Assembly. He was an electrician.

References

1936 births
Living people
Nevada Democrats
People from DeLand, Florida
People from North Las Vegas, Nevada